The Order of the Colonial Empire (Portuguese:"Ordem do Império Colonial") was a Portuguese Order (decoration), established on 13 April 1932 as a colonial order of knighthood, to reward services by soldiers and civilians in the Portuguese colonies in Asia and Africa.

The Order consisted of five grades:
Grand Cross, which wore the badge on a sash on the right shoulder and the star on the left chest;
Grand Officer, which wore the badge on a necklet and the star on the left chest;
Commander, which wore the badge on a necklet and the star on the left chest;
Officer, which wore the badge on a ribbon with rosette on the left chest;
Knight, which wore the badge on a ribbon on the left chest.

The Commander grade was dropped sometime during the 1960s , and the Order was discontinued upon the Carnation Revolution in 1974.

Insignia
The badge of the Order was an enamel Order of Christ Cross, in silver for Knight and in gilt for higher grades, with the lesser Coat of arms of Portugal in enamel and gilt at the centre.

The star of the Order was an eight-pointed faceted star, in gilt for Grand Cross and Grand Officer, in silver for Commander, with the badge of the Order at the centre.

The ribbon of the Order was red with black central and edge stripes.

Notable Recipients 
 António de Eça de Queirós
 António de Oliveira Salazar
Grand Crosses:

 George V of the United Kingdom
 Prince George, Duke of Kent
 Mozambique Company

References

Colonial orders of chivalry
Orders, decorations, and medals of Portugal
Portuguese Empire
Awards established in 1932
Awards disestablished in 1974
1932 establishments in Portugal
1974 disestablishments in Portugal